James Edwards Mills (born 1966) is an African American author, freelance journalist, outdoor guide and independent media producer.

Mills wrote The Adventure Gap: Changing the Face of the Outdoors. He has contributed to publications including National Geographic, Rock & Ice and Alpinist. Mills was one of the creative minds behind An American Ascent, a documentary chronicling the first all African American ascent of Denali, North America's highest peak.

Biography 

Growing up in Los Angeles, California, Mills developed an interest in the outdoors through his participation in a local Boy Scout troop. He subsequently started an outdoor focused career in 1989, spending time as a guide, outfitter, and sales rep.

In 2013, alongside Aparna Rajagopal-Durbin and Jeanne O’Brian of the National Outdoor Leadership School (NOLS), Mills helped organize the first all African American expedition to successfully summit Denali, North America's highest peak. Mills intended to take part in the bid for Denali's peak, but a hip replacement operation prevented him from joining the summit team. A documentary about the Denali expedition entitled: An American Ascent was subsequently produced. Mills acted as a cowriter and coproducer on this production.

In 2014, Mills authored The Adventure Gap: Changing the Face of the Outdoors, which explores the difficulties minorities face when seeking to utilize the nation's outdoor resources while highlighting role models who found ways to participate in outdoor recreation despite these barriers. Mills has also contributed to a variety of publications including National Geographic, Rock & Ice and Alpinist. He is the founder of "The Joy Trip Project", a blog, reporting and podcast series focused on outdoor recreation.

Through the University of Wisconsin's Nelson Institute for Environmental Studies, Mills taught a summer course entitled: 'Outdoors for All'. This course focused on exploring historical barriers to diversity in the outdoors and finding solutions to make access to the outdoors more equitable.

Awards & honors 

 Paul K. Petzoldt Award For Environmental Education (2016)
 Yosemite National Park Centennial Ambassador (2016)
Banff Centre Mountain & Wilderness Writing Program Fellow (2014)

Published works

Books
The Adventure Gap: Changing the Face of the Outdoors, Seattle: 2014. ISBN 9781594858680.

Selected articles
 Here's how national parks are working to fight racism (2020)
 These people of color transformed U.S. national parks (2020)
 Opinion: Built on smoke (2020)
No Pain, No Change (2019)
The Force of the Soul: Hugues Beauzile (2018)
Polar Explorer Eric Larsen Begins Attempt to Bike to the South Pole (2012)
Wired - Exploring The Adventure Gap (2012)

Filmography 

 An American Ascent (2014)
Credited as a cowriter and coproducer on the production.

 Breaking Trail (2021)

Credited as a coproducer on the production.

Awards

An American Ascent won Best Feature Film at the Mountain & Adventure Film Festival. It was also won Best Documentary and Best Director at the San Diego Black Film Festival. The film was privately screened at the White House in June 2015.

Breaking Trail was an Official Selection for the 2021 Banff Mountain Film Festival. In 2022, Breaking Trail won Best Mountain Culture Film at the Vancouver International Mountain Film Fest, Eric Moe Best Short Film Award at the Environmental Film Festival, Best Short Film at the Frozen River Film Festival and Best Short Film (People's Choice) at the Boulder International Film Festival.

Legacy 
In 2020, Outside Magazine named The Adventure Gap one of the 10 "Outdoor Books that Shaped the Last Decade".

References

External links 
 joytripproject.com (official site)
 anamericanascent.com (official site)

 

American mountain climbers
21st-century American male writers
African-American writers
African-American activists
African-American journalists
1966 births
Living people
People from Los Angeles
20th-century African-American people